John Alexander Fraser Roberts CBE FRS FRSE FRCP FRAI (1899–1987) was a 20th-century British geneticist and psychiatrist.

Life

He was born on 8 September 1899 at Foxhall at Henllan near Denbigh in Wales, the first son of Robert Henry Roberts (1868-1951) a farmer, and his wife, Elizabeth (Lily) Mary Fraser. His mother was the daughter of Alexander Fraser of Caernarfon, from a long line of Scottish Highland drapers. He was educated at Denbigh Grammar School. His studies of Sciences at Bangor University where interrupted by the First World War during which (due to age) he served only in the final year, as a 2nd Lieutenant in the Royal Welsh Fusiliers. Returning to Bangor he graduated BSc in 1920. He then went to Cambridge University graduating BA in 1922 and MA in 1925. With these new gained qualifications he joined the staff of Burden Mental Research Department at Stoke Park Colony in Bristol.

He then won a place at the University of Edinburgh as a postgraduate first gaining a doctorate (DSc) in 1933 then studying medicine and graduated with a MB ChB in 1936.

In 1926, aged 26, he was elected a Fellow of the Royal Society of Edinburgh. His proposers were Francis Albert Eley Crew, James Cossar Ewart, James Hartley Ashworth, and Alexander Lauder. In 1963 he was elected a Fellow of the Royal Society of London.

In the Second World War he served as a Surgeon Commander in the Royal Navy Volunteer Reserve. From 1942 he acted as a consultant on Medical Statistics to the Royal Navy.

After the war he returned to the Stoke Park Colony as Director of the Burden Mental Research Department, staying there until 1957. In 1964 he was appointed Geneticist at the Paediatric Research Unit of Guy's Hospital Medical School in London. From 1957 to 1959 he was President of the Royal Anthropological Institute of Great Britain and Ireland.

He retired in 1981 and died on 15 January 1987. He was married to the British actress Doris Hare, who appeared in the classic British sitcom On The Buses

Family

In 1941 he married the actress Doris Hare and they were married 32 years until their divorce in 1973, together they had two daughters. After divorcing he married Margaret Ralph in 1975.

Publications

An Introduction to Medical Genetics (1940) with later editions

References

1899 births
1987 deaths
Welsh geneticists
Fellows of the Royal Society of Edinburgh
Fellows of the Royal Society
Fellows of the Royal Anthropological Institute of Great Britain and Ireland
Presidents of the Royal Anthropological Institute of Great Britain and Ireland